Telema tenella is a species of spider in the family Telemidae. The species is endemic to the eastern Pyrénées between Spain and France.

Description 
Telema tenella has a length of about 1.5 to 2 mm. Being cave-dwelling, it is eyeless. It is also lungless. This spider can live up to sixteen years old, including twelve years as an adult.

Distribution 
Telema tenella is found in the caves of the eastern Pyrénées. In France, it can be found in Pyrénées-Orientales around the Canigou, in Montferrer and La Preste. In Spain, it is found in the province of Girona.

References

External links 
 

Endemic arthropods of Metropolitan France
Endemic fauna of Spain
Telemidae
Spiders of Europe
Spiders described in 1882